The Eriskay Pony ( or Each Èirisgeach) is a breed of pony from Scotland. It is generally grey in colour, and has a dense, waterproof coat that protects it in harsh weather. The breed developed in ancient times in the Hebrides of Scotland, and a small population remained pure and protected from crossbreeding by the remoteness of the islands. It is used for light draught  work, as a mount for children, in many equestrian disciplines, and for driving. The breed is rare today, with the Rare Breeds Survival Trust considering their status critical. There are two breed registries for the Eriskay Pony: Comann Each nan Eilean - The Eriskay Pony Society, which was formed in 1972 and has the King Charles III as society patron, and The Eriskay Pony Society was formed in 1986. Both societies are recognised as holding a studbook of origin for the breed.

Characteristics

It is usually grey in colour, although a few are bay or black. Dark coloured animals generally have the pangaré characteristics of a light-coloured muzzle and ring around their eye. However, according to breed standards set by the late Robert Beck MRCVS BVMS, a longstanding member of Comann Each nan Eilean - The Eriskay Pony Society, they should not have an eel stripe. Chestnut, piebald, skewbald and excess white markings are discouraged by breed registries. The winter coat is dense and waterproof to protect from the harsh climate, with a thick mane and tail. The head is large, with a wide forehead. The neck and shoulders are well muscled, and the chest deep but generally not broad. The rib-cage is long and the loins short, which increases the strength of the back. The croup is slightly sloping. It is quite similar to the Exmoor pony in body type. The Eriskay has an easy-going temperament and is suitable as a mount for children. It is used for light draught work, as well as dressage, show jumping, three-day eventing, western riding and driving. Eriskays have successfully competed in combined driving at highly competitive international level competitions sanctioned by the Fédération Équestre Internationale. They have also been used in therapeutic horse-riding.

History

The Eriskay Pony developed in the Isle of Eriskay in the Outer Hebrides, a group of western isles in Scotland. The origins of the breed are ancient, with roots in Celtic and Norse breeding. It is physically similar to drawings of ponies on ancient Pictish stones found in north and west Scotland. It is related to other northern breeds, including the Icelandic horse and the Faroe pony. The Eriskay takes its name from the island of Eriskay in the Outer Hebrides. Originally, the breed had a fairly large population, and until the mid-19th century the Eriskay and similar ponies were found throughout the western islands of Scotland. They were used as crofters' ponies, as pack animals, for light draught and as mounts for children.

During the 19th century numbers were much reduced through increased crossbreeding. The crossbreeding was used to produce larger ponies for draught work, and Eriskays and other island ponies were crossed with horse breeds from mainland Europe, including Arabs and Clydesdales. Other horses, including the Norwegian Fjord, were crossed with island ponies, including the Eriskay, to produce the Highland pony.  A few specimens of the Eriskay were preserved on the remotest island of  Eriskay in Scotland, mainly due to the difficulties of accessing the island. This stock of ponies remained pure, but through the advent of mechanisation, declined in population to around 20 animals in the early 1970s. In 1941 the SS Politician foundered off the Eriskay coast, and the islanders, using the Eriskay ponies, carried away the cargo of 250,000 bottles of whisky.

Today the Eriskay is rare. Its population is considered to be at critical status by the UK-based Rare Breeds Survival Trust, meaning that there are 300 or fewer breeding females registered in the world today. It is possible that the Eriskay is the last surviving Hebridean pony breed. There are two breed Societies each of which are Mother Societies in their own right: The Eriskay Pony Society achieved legal recognition as a breed society and passport issuing organisation for the UK in 1995 and Comann Each nan Eilean - The Eriskay Pony Society, which is based in the Isle of Eriskay, received legal recognition in 2002. Both Societies maintain studbooks which are recognised as studbooks of origin for the Eriskay Pony and Comann Each nan Eilean - The Eriskay Pony Society keeps the original studbooks of the Society for the Preservation of the Eriskay Pony from 1972. Both studbooks have their origins in the original studbook. The aim of both Societies is to preserve the breed by retaining the original genetic material and following a careful breeding programme which slows, as far as possible, the rate of inbreeding. Only stock registered in either of the studbooks is used. In conjunction with the Rare Breeds Survival Trust The Eriskay Pony Society uses the Single Population Analysis Records Keeping System (SPARKS) to provide advice on the genetic suitability of breeding pairs of ponies.    

In addition to the domesticated ponies, there is a small herd of Eriskay ponies living in a feral state on the Holy Isle. These ponies are descended from a group of five ponies brought to the Holy Isle to when it was owned by the Universities Federation for Animal Welfare in the 1970s to form a nature reserve. Today the island is owned by the Samye Buddhist Centre for World Peace and Health. They operate a policy of non-intervention, allowing the ponies to live without human interference.

Culture 
The Gaelic poet Donald MacDonald (Dòmhnall Aonghais Bhàin) was commissioned by Comann Each nan Eilean - The Eriskay Pony Society to compose a praise poem for the Eriskay pony to commemorate the publication of the original studbook in 1972. The poem makes reference to the pony's position as a crofting animal used to transport seaweed and peat, as well as its genial nature towards children.Bha iad riamh an Èirisgeidh 's gum b' fheumail iad don t-sluagh,

Bha iad troimh na linntean ann sna tìmean chaidh air ruaig;

Thàirneadh iad a' mhòine gu fògairt chur air fuachd

Is làimhsicheadh an òigridh iad 's bha iomadh spòrs 'nan cuairt.

See also
 List of domesticated Scottish breeds

References

External links

 Eriskay Pony Society
 The Eriskay Pony (Purebred)Studbook Society): Comann Each nan Eilean

Horse breeds originating in Scotland
Horse breeds
Outer Hebrides
Endemic biota of the Scottish islands
Animal breeds on the RBST Watchlist